Osteoarthritis and Cartilage is  monthly peer-reviewed medical journal covering research in orthopedics and rheumatology. It is an official journal of the Osteoarthritis Research Society International, published on their behalf by Elsevier.

External links 
 

Elsevier academic journals
English-language journals
Rheumatology journals
Monthly journals
Orthopedics journals
Publications established in 1993